De Materie (Matter) is a four-part vocal and orchestral work by Dutch composer Louis Andriessen, written over the period 1984 to 1988. Robert Wilson directed the first staging of the work on 1 June 1989 at the Muziektheater, Amsterdam, with James Doing, Wendy Hill, Beppie Blankert and Marjon Brandsma as the soloists at the premiere. In the US, Part II of the work, "Hadewijch", was performed at the Tanglewood Festival in 1994. The complete work received its first US performance in 2004 at Lincoln Center, New York City.  "Hadewijch" received its UK premiere at the 1993 Huddersfield Contemporary Music Festival. The UK premiere of the full work was at the Meltdown Festival in 1994.

The work incorporates eclectic musical influences, ranging from Johann Sebastian Bach and Igor Stravinsky to the old Netherlands chanson "L'homme armé" and 20th-century boogie-woogie. The work opens with 144 iterations of the same chord played fortissimo (very loud) and features an extended solo for two large metal boxes played with hammers.  The texts are both sung and spoken.  The four sections of the work incorporate various texts, with the dates of composition of each section in parentheses:
 Part I ("De Materie", 1986–1987): the 1581 Plakkaat van Verlatinge (Act of Abjuration), with a text on shipbuilding by Nicolaes Witsen and the Idea Physicæ of David van Goorle - 
 Part II ("Hadewijch", 1987–1988): Zevende Visioen (Seventh Vision) by Hadewijch - 
 Part III ("'De Stijl", 1984–1985): text from The Principles of Plastic Mathematics by M. H. J. Schoenmaekers, along with quotes by M. van Domselaer-Middelkoop about his friend, the Dutch painter Piet Mondrian - 
 Part IV (untitled): excerpts from two sonnets by Willem Kloos, along with a passage from the diary of Marie Curie and her Nobel Prize speech - 

(Timings in minutes and seconds, from the Nonesuch CD listed below)

Recording
 Nonesuch 7559-79367-2: Susan Narucki, James Doing, Cindy Oswin, Gertrude Thoma; Members of the Netherlands Chamber Choir; Schönberg Ensemble; Asko Ensemble; Reinbert de Leeuw, conductor

References

External links
 Boosey & Hawkes publisher page on De Materie

Compositions by Louis Andriessen
Choral compositions
1988 compositions